Christoph Hammer (born 12 June 1966) is a German conductor, forte piano player, musicologist and specialist of  historically informed performance.

Life

Youth 

Forte piano player 
Since 1989 he has concentrated on the playing of historical keyboard instruments, especially the Hammerklavier. As a soloist, song accompanist and chamber musician, he has gained an international reputation. He regularly works with ensembles such as the Concerto Köln, L'Orfeo Barockorchester, the Nederlands Kammerorchest, the Prague Chamber Orchestra. The same applies to work with vocal and instrumental soloists such as Emma Kirkby, Rufus Müller, Martin Bruns, Jan Kobow, Axel Köhler, Dominik Wörner, Anton Steck, Reinhold Johannes Buhl, Guido Larisch, Martin Sandhoff, Florian Deuter and others. He has made numerous recordings for Oehms Classics, BR and ORF.

Tangent piano Player 
In 2012, Hammer, together with Sylvia Ackermann, presented a tangent piano to the public in a concert. This was discovered in 2006 in Sulzbach-Rosenberg in the estate of Johann Esaias von Seidel in its original state and then elaborately restored.

New Hofkapelle München 
In 1996, he founded this ensemble, with which he restages widely unknown music of the 17th and 18th century from the Bavarian residences and churches, for example from Munich and Regensburg.

Opera conductor 
In 2004, he conducted Jean Philippe Rameau's Dardanus at the Stadttheater Passau. In 2005, Hammer took over the conducting of Monteverdi's L'Orfeo at the Landestheater Linz. In 2006, he conducted Handel's Lotario at the Handel Festival Karlsruhe. In 2007, he was responsible for the musical realisation of Reinhard Keiser's Fredegunda with the new  in a production of the Bayerische Theaterakademie August Everding, which was staged once again in 2008 at the Theater Bremen under Hammer's musical direction. In June 2008, Die Nacht by Einar Schleef had its premiere at the Bayerische Theaterakademie.

Teaching activities 
In 2002, he began teaching at the University of Seattle and at the University of Music and Performing Arts Munich. Since August 2009, Hammer has been professor for harpsichord and fortepiano at the University of Northern Texas. Since August 2017, he is professor for historical keyboard instruments at the Leopold Mozart Centre of the University of Augsburg.

Honours and awards 
 1985: First prize at Jugend musiziert in organ.
 1985: Special prize for the best interpretation of a contemporary work.
 2002: Kulturförderpreis of the Free State of Bavaria.
 2004: Prize of the Bavarian Volksstiftung.

References

External links 
 
 

German conductors (music)
German harpsichordists
German performers of early music
Academic staff of the University of Music and Performing Arts Munich
1966 births
Living people
Musicians from Bavaria